The Daemen Wildcats represent Daemen University in intercollegiate athletics. Daemen is a member of the East Coast Conference (ECC), competing at the Division II level of the National Collegiate Athletic Association (NCAA). Men's sports include basketball, cross country, golf, indoor track and outdoor track, soccer, tennis, and volleyball. Women's sports include basketball, bowling, cross country, indoor and outdoor track, soccer, tennis, triathlon, and volleyball.  The college's official colors are royal blue, black, white, and grey.

History
The Wildcats compete mainly in NCAA Division II and are part of the East Coast Conference (ECC) since the 2013–14 school year. They formerly competed in the National Association of Intercollegiate Athletics (NAIA) as part of the now-defunct American Midwest Conference (AMC) from 2001–02 to 2011–12; as well as an Independent during its transition to D-II in the 2012–13 school year.

Two Daemen sports compete as de facto NCAA Division I members. Women's triathlon, part of the NCAA Emerging Sports for Women program, is not part of the NCAA's divisional structure. Daemen competes as an independent in that sport. In men's volleyball, the NCAA holds a combined national championship for Divisions I and II. As of the next NCAA men's volleyball season in 2023, the Wildcats will compete as associate members of the D-I Northeast Conference.

Varsity sports

Teams

Men's sports
 Basketball
 Cross Country
 Golf
 Soccer
 Tennis
 Track & Field indoor
 Track & Field outdoor
 Volleyball

Women's sports
 Basketball
 Bowling
 Cross Country
 Soccer
 Tennis
 Track & Field indoor
 Track & Field outdoor
 Triathlon
 Volleyball

References

External links